General elections were held in Grenada on 13 March 2018. The result was a victory for the New National Party and incumbent Prime Minister Keith Mitchell, winning his fifth term in office.

Electoral system
The 15 members of the House of Representatives are elected by first-past-the-post voting in single-member constituencies.

Results

References

Elections in Grenada
General
Grenada
Grenada
Landslide victories